Cham-e Siah (also Romanized as Cham-e Sīāh) is a village in Howmeh Rural District, in the Central District of Behbahan County, Khuzestan Province, Iran. At the 2006 census, its population was 118, in 22 families.

References 

Populated places in Behbahan County